Ancilla College was a private Roman Catholic junior college near Donaldson, Indiana. It was founded by the Poor Handmaids of Jesus Christ in 1937 as an extension of DePaul University for the training of Catholic novices and candidates of the Poor Handmaids of Jesus Christ. In 1966 the college started admitting the public as a private liberal arts community college. Ancilla College focuses on serving the seven surrounding counties of Indiana. Ancilla College granted associate degrees in multiple programs and had transfer agreements with 14 Indiana colleges and universities. The Latin word ancilla means "handmaid or servant," a reference to the college's sponsor, The Poor Handmaids of Jesus Christ.

In 2021 Ancilla College was merged into Marian University, a fellow Catholic institution based in Indianapolis, Indiana.

Athletics
The Ancilla Chargers compete in the MCCAA and the NJCAA. Their soccer, volleyball, baseball and softball games are broadcast by the Regional Radio Sports Network.

References

External links

Liberal arts colleges in Indiana
Michigan Community College Athletic Association
Educational institutions established in 1937
Association of Catholic Colleges and Universities
Education in Marshall County, Indiana
Catholic universities and colleges in Indiana
Roman Catholic Diocese of Fort Wayne–South Bend
NJCAA athletics
1937 establishments in Indiana
Marian University (Indiana)